Steve Fisher also known as "The Fish" (born September 21, 1982 in Olathe, Kansas) is an American professional snowboarder and the 2004 and 2007 Winter X Games Champion. He was once ranked the #1 halfpipe rider in the United States by the USSA ranking system.

Childhood and early snowboarding career
Steve grew up in Saint Louis Park, a suburb out of Minneapolis. As a young boy, his home mountain was Buck Hill which was home to one of the first halfpipes in the Midwest. Steve rode at Buck hill every day and night until he was ten years old, saying that he rarely spent any time at home during the winter. He began competing in local competitions at age eight and qualified for USASA nationals by age nine. Fisher went pro in 2002 when he was asked by the US Snowboarding Team to forerun the 2002 Olympic halfpipe event and become a part of US Snowboarding.

Riding Style
Fisher rides regular stance, eighteen and negative six degrees on his board. He is known for his smooth yet aggressive riding style and technical backside 540's. He can be seen teaching his infamous backside 540's in Transworld Snowboarding's 20 Tricks II video. While he is best known for his skills in the halfpipe, Steve remains a well-rounded rider capable of riding rails, jumps, and natural backcountry features.

Career highlights

Other projects
When he is not snowboarding, mountain biking, fishing, or hiking, Steve is an avid blogger who writes several blogs for various websites.

Because his father was diagnosed with and recovered from prostate cancer, Steve is involved with the Prostate Cancer Foundation. Working with their Athletes for a Cure program, Steve is helping build awareness of this prevalent disease.

References

1982 births
Living people
Sportspeople from Olathe, Kansas
American male snowboarders
X Games athletes